The Aérodrome Saint-Louis, also called Aérodrome du Bois Gomin or Canadian Transcontinental Airways Airport, was the first airfield of the Quebec City area of Quebec, Canada. It was located in the suburb of Sainte-Foy.

It was established by Canadian Transcontinental Airways (1927–38)  (Compagnie Aérienne Transcontinentale) in 1928 in the fields between Cap-Rouge Road (now called Chemin Saint-Louis) and Gomin Road (Chemin Gomin), east of the Route de l'Église where the Laurier Québec and Place Sainte-Foy shopping centres are currently located. It was used during winter to transport mail between Montreal and Rimouski.

It was closed in 1938, when Canadian Transcontinental Airways ceased operations, and in 1939 a new airfield was established in Quebec City; Aéroport de l'Ancienne Lorette, today known as Québec City Jean Lesage International Airport.

See also
 List of airports in Canada
 Québec/Lac Saint-Augustin Water Airport

External links
 Un chemin Gomin au long parcours

Saint-Louis
Transport in Quebec City

fr:Aéroport international Jean-Lesage de Québec